Annette Elsa Katarina Ewerlöf (born 28 December 1959) is a Swedish actress. She began acting in theater when she was 13 years old at Vår teater, a children's theater in Stockholm. Ewerlöf was educated at the theater university at the Stockholm Scene School (Scenskolan i Stockholm), and has worked at the Royal Dramatic Theatre. Ewerlöf worked for many years in the 1970s and 1980s away from public attention in theaters, and had her first big hit as a major part in the TV series Pappas flicka in 1997. She has recorded some audiobooks.

Filmography
2003 - Paradiset (Paradise), Anne Snapphane
2000 - Livet är en schlager (Once in a Lifetime), Studio hostess
1999 - Tomten är far till alla barnen (In Bed With Santa), Sara
1998 - Beck – Vita nätter (Beck – White Nights), Jeanette Bolin
1979 - Kristoffers hus (Kristoffer's house), Party guest

Television
2016–2017 - Black Widows
2013 - Fjällbackamorden – Havet ger, havet tar, Anette
2008 - Irene Huss – Glasdjävulen, Eva Möller
2005 - Kommissionen (The Commission), Lena Lagerfelt
2002 - Talismanen (The Talisman), Ann-Britt Höglund
2001 - Återkomsten (The Return), Pathologist
1997 - Pelle Svanslös, Mirjam
1997 - Pappas flicka (Daddy's Girl), Mona Kollberg
1997 - Skärgårdsdoktorn, Maria Lindelius
1996 - Zonen (The Zone), Cecilia Lagerlöf
1996 - Nudlar & 08:or (Noodles and Stockholmers), Laila
1989 - Husbonden (The Master), Karolin

References

References

External links

Living people
1959 births
Swedish film actresses
Swedish television actresses
Swedish comedians
Best Actress Guldbagge Award winners